Cain at Abel (International title: Color of My Blood / ) is a Philippine television drama action series broadcast by GMA Network. Directed by Mark A. Reyes, it stars Dingdong Dantes and Dennis Trillo. It premiered on November 19, 2018 on the network's Telebabad line up replacing Victor Magtanggol. The series concluded on February 15, 2019 with a total of 65 episodes. It was replaced by Kara Mia in its timeslot.

The series is streaming online on YouTube.

Premise
Brothers, Daniel and Miguel grew up in different worlds as they were separated when they were kids. Daniel was raised in the city by his father, while Miguel, was taken by his mother and relocated to a fishing village where they struggled. Years later, the brothers are drawn together by their parents.

Cast and characters

Lead cast
 Dingdong Dantes as Daniel Anthony Larrazabal
 Dennis Trillo as Miguel Anthony Larrazabal / Elias Ledesma / Simon
Supporting cast
 Solenn Heussaff as Abigail Buenaventura
 Sanya Lopez as Margaret  Tolentino
 Eddie Gutierrez as Antonio Larrazabal
 Chanda Romero as Belenita "Belen" Castillo-Larrazabal / Fe Ledesma
 Dina Bonnevie as Priscilla "Precy" Rodrigo-Larrazabal
 Ronnie Henares as Gener Buenaventura
 Boy 2 Quizon as Juancho Pelaez
 Shyr Valdez as Tina Tolentino
 Leandro Baldemor as Darius Tolentino
 Bing Pimentel as Linda Buenaventura
 Ervic Vijandre as Alex Ibarra
 Renz Fernandez as Louie Fernando
 Pauline Mendoza as Patricia "Pat" Tolentino
 Carlo Gonzales as Ronald Castro
 Vince Vandorpe as Rafael R. Larrazabal
 Djanin Cruz as Eunice

Guest cast
 Yasmien Kurdi as young Belen
 Rafael Rosell as young Antonio
 Diana Zubiri as young Precy
 David Remo as young Daniel
 Seth dela Cruz as young Miguel
 Zachi Rivera as young Margaret
Ashley Cabrera as young Abigail
 Fabio Ide as Brent Evangelista
 Ping Medina as Poldo
 Marc Abaya as Ramon
 Juan Rodrigo as Oscar Evangelista
 Sophia Senoron as Julie
 Euwenn Aleta as Samuel "Sammy" T. Ledesma
 Carlos Agassi as Gabo 
 Dindo Arroyo as Jaime
 Mika Gorospe as Jackie
 Martin del Rosario as young William
 Tommy Abuel as William Bernardino
 Emilio Garcia as Treb / Boss Treb
 Lucho Ayala as Roel 
 Muriel Lomadilla as Cacai
 Ameera Johara as Sabrina
 Roi Vinzon as Diego Javellana Garcia
 Jay Arcilla as Gilbert
 Levi Ignacio as Carding
 Ina Feleo as Lucille Ibarra

Accolades

References

External links
 
 

2018 Philippine television series debuts
2019 Philippine television series endings
Filipino-language television shows
GMA Network drama series
Philippine action television series
Television shows set in the Philippines